This is a list of films produced in Haiti:

A

 A la mise pour Rodrig by Claude L.C. Mancuso  (1980)
 Albert Mangones, l'espace public (2010) by Arnold Antonin
 Alatraka pou Baba by Raynald Delerme]
 Alelouya by Richard J. Arens (2005)
 Ana by Valentin C. Lustra (2011)
 Anita (1982)
 Art Naif and Repression in Haiti (1976) by Arnold Antonin
 Ayiti Mon Amour (2016)
 Ayiti Toma (2014) by Joseph Hillel

B
Barikad by Richard Senecal (2003)
Blooming Hope: Harvesting Smiles in Port-de-Paix (2010)
Breaking Leaves (1998)
Belle Enfant Noire by Jean René Descayette (2006)avec la participation de Black Alex

C
Café au lait, bien sucré (2005)
Can sculpture save the village of Noailles? (2009) by Arnold Antonin
Canne amère (1983)
Cedor ou l'esthétique de la modestie (2002) by Arnold Antonin
Chère Catherine (1997)
ChomeCo by Richard J. Arens (2007)
Collusion (2009) Herold Israel & Peter Ronald Berlus
Couloir de L'amitié by Vladimir Thelisma (2010)
Coup de foudre (Frantz Saint Louis) 2007
Cousines by Richard Senecal (2006)
Culture Clash (2014) by Jean-René Rinvil

D
Des hommes et dieux (2002)
Desounen: Dialogue with Death (1994)
Destin Tragique by Vladimir Thelisma (2006)
Disturbed by Vladimir Lescouflair (2010)
Dolores by Herold Israel (2006)
Double jeu by Vladimir Thelisma (2001)

E
Endurance by Samuel Vincent (2015)
E Pluribus Unum (2001)
Et moi je suis belle (1962)
Évangile du cochon créole, L′ (2004)

F
 Fabiola by Armelle Jacotin (2006)
 Fam se rat by Wilfort Estimable (2009)
 Forgiveness (Le Pardon) by Benedict Lamartine (2008)
 Forgiveness 2 by Samuel Vincent (2012)
 Founérailles byRaynald Delerme (1986)
Fò Dimanch – Fò Lanmò, short documentary with Jan Mapou by Ronald Osias (2016)
 Freda (2021)

H
Haiti - Apocalypse Now - January 12, 2010 (2011) by Arnold Antonin
Haiti - Le silence des chiens (1994)
Haïti: la fin des chimères?... (2004)
Haiti, le chemin de la liberté (1973) by Arnold Antonin
Haitian Corner (1988) 
Haitian Slave Children (2001)
Haiti Cherie: Wind Of Hope by Richard J. Arens (2010)
Haiti: Triumph, Sorrow, and the Struggle of a People (2010) (Jonas Nosile) (Vieux-Bourgeois Picture) (ABC TV)
Herby, Jazz and Haitian Music (2012) by Arnold Antonin
Histoire D'infidèles (2009), Peter Ronald Berlus

I
I Love You Anne (2005) by Richard Senecal 
I Love You Anne 2 (2014) by Richard Senecal
Infidélité by Raynald Delerme
Impasse (2011) by Jean-René Rinvil
Izabel (2017) by Samuel Pierre Louis

J
Jacques Roumain, the passion for a country (2008) by Arnold Antonin
Journee de couleur
July-7 by Robenson Lauvince

K
Krik? Krak! Tales of a Nightmare (1988), based on a novel by Edwidge Danticat

Kafou(2017), Un film de Bruno Mourral sur le Kidnapping.
Kreyolizay 1960, short documentary with Jan Mapou by Ronald Osias (2019)

L
L'Amour Et L'Amitié by TUTU Desmonthene (2005)
L'Enquête se Poursuit by Raynald Delerme 
L'Homme sur les quais (1993)
L'Imposteur Impromptu by Zagallo Prince, featuring Stardeak Durand and Marie Yves-Elda Calixte (2011)
La Face De Judas by Nacha Laguerre,  (2005)
La Famille Chabi by Nacha Laguerre (2007)
Lala Desma Duclair (2010)
La Femme de mon Ami by Raynald Delerme]
La Peur D'aimer (2000) by Reginal Lubin
La Pluie d'espoir (2007) by jack roche 
La Rebelle (2005)
La Ronde des vodu (1987)
La vengeance de Rodney (Laura 2) (2009) by Valentin C. Lustra
La Vie de Job by Valentin C. Lustra
Lakay (2011) by Hugues Gentillon
Lakay (2014) by Tirf Alexius
Lavichè: A crisis for the poor in Haiti (2002) by Jean-René Rinvil
Laura by Valentin C. Lustra
Le Miracle de la foi (2005)
Le President a-t-il Le Sida (2006) by Arnold Antonin
Les Amours d'un Zombi (2010) by Arnold Antonin
Les Aventures de Jessica by Valentin C. Lustra
Les Couleurs de la Dignite by Vladimir Thelisma (2006)
Les Evades (2013) by Valentin C. Lustra
Les Gens de Bien (1988) by Raynald Delerme
Les tontons noel aux sacs vides by Jean Claude Fanfan
Life in a Haitian Valley Film Study (1934)
Lovdatnet (2009) by Herold Israel and Peter Ronald Berlus 
Love Me Haiti (2014) by Hugues Gentillon
Lumumba (2000)

M
Mea Culpa by Samuel Vincent (2011)
Ma femme et le voisin by Riquet Michel (2004)
Miami en action
My name is... by Richard J. Arens (2007)
 Married Man by Robenson Lauvince (2019)

N
Natalie by Samuel Vincent (2007)

P
Player 1/2 by Herold Israel (2006)
Pluie d'espoir (2005)
Pouki se mwen by Reginal Lubin
Pour l'Amour de Suzie by Raynald Delerme] (2000)
Prefete Duffaut - Piety and Urban Imagination (2006) by Arnold Antonin
Profit & Nothing But! (2001)
Prosameres, Herold Israel (2010)

R
Remo (2008)
Rezistans (1997)
Royal Bonbon (2002)
The Ransom  (2022)

S
Sarah (2009) by Samuel Vincent
Sarah 2 (2015) by Samuel Vincent
San Papye (2008) by Hans Patrick Domercant
Santo contra la magia negra (1973)
Sentaniz (2011) by Nacha Laguerre
Sherico s.a. (1989) by Raynald Delerme 
Show Kola (2008) by Richard J. Arens
Six Exceptional Women (2012) by Arnold Antonin
Sonson (2003) by Jean-Claude Bourjolly
Souvenance (1991)
Suspicion (2015) by Samuel Pierre Louis

T
Temptation by Samuel Vincent (2005)
The Love of a Zombi or Can a Zombi be President? (2010) by Arnold Antonin
The Son Of The Evil by Tutu Desmonthene (2007)
TIGA: Haiti, Dream, Creation, Possession, Madness (2006) by Arnold Antonin

W
Where The Justice At (2009) by Tony Delerme
White Darkness, The (2002)

V
Vengeance Sexuelle (2009) by Belus Roosvelt
Vocation by Valery Numa

X
Xtreme Blue (2008), Herold Israel

Z
Zatrap (1980)

See also
 Cinema of Haiti
 Cinema of the Caribbean
 List of Caribbean films

External links
 http://www.haitianfilms.com/
 http://www.haiticinema.info
 Haitian film at the Internet Movie Database